Champion Road is a British television series which originally aired on the BBC in 1958.

Main cast
 William Lucas as Jonathan Briggs
 Anna Turner as Nellie Greenhalgh
 Joby Blanshard as Alf Burton
 John Paul as A.J. Clough
 Jennifer Wilson as Janet Pemberton 
 Bryan Hulme as Steven Briggs
 George A. Cooper as Abe Duckworth
 Peter Bryant as  Raymond Kempshaw
 Nan Marriott-Watson as Grandma Pilling
 Violet Carson as Mrs. Briggs
 Fred Fairclough as Grandfather Briggs
 Jennifer Hales as Geraldine Forbes
 Prunella Scales as Betty Gray
 Brenda Cowling as Miss Doubleday

References

Bibliography
Baskin, Ellen . Serials on British Television, 1950-1994. Scolar Press, 1996.

External links
 

BBC television dramas
1958 British television series debuts
1958 British television series endings
English-language television shows